The Aarhus Letbane (Aarhus light rail) is a light rail system in the city of Aarhus, Denmark. It is operated by the company Midttrafik. The first line opened in December 2017, but the system is under continuous development and expansion. Service on the intercity section Odder to Lisbjergskolen opened on August 25, 2018. A third intercity line to Grenå opened on 30 April 2019. More lines are being planned.

On 8 May 2012, the Danish Parliament approved the construction of the first line; work to build Phase 1 commenced during September 2013. It was originally planned to open in August 2016, but this was delayed, in part due to legislative issues in relation to railway safety.

Two types of rolling stock have been operated over the first line, conventional trams which are slower and restricted to only running along some parts of the route and hybrid tram-trains that can be operated on the conventional heavy rail network, the latter being used for the long-distance services.

The Aarhus Letbane was the only operational light rail system in Denmark until the Odense Letbane opened on 28 May 2022. Denmark's third Light Rail project, the Greater Copenhagen Light Rail, is currently under construction.

History

Background
The development of a light rail system around Aarhus, the second biggest city in Denmark, was originally proposed as early as 2006. In response to rising interest in the concept, during January 2009, the Danish Parliament granted an allocation of DKK500 million ($85 million) to support the light rail project as part of a wider green transport package.

During October 2010, work commenced upon several studies. According to transport authority Midttrafik, who later operated the completed network, the Aarhus light rail programme had drawn considerable inspiration from tram-train operations on the tram network in Kassel, Germany. In addition, consultancy firms COWI A/S and SYSTRA contributed their own studies and technical support for the project, including an initial feasibility study and development of tender documentation. The project's Environmental Impact Assessment (EIA) report was produced by C. F. Moller; it was estimated that establishing the light rail network would result in annual energy savings of 47 gigawatts and reduce carbon dioxide emissions by  during each year of operation.

Various different approaches for the network were being considered at one stage, including the full electrification of the route, the procurement of a combination of 750 V DC trams and electro-diesel tram-trains. It was recognised that, if the option of full electrification was to be exercised, a catenary-free system may be chosen for the harbour-side element of Phase 1. By late 2012, it had already been decided that Germany's BOStrab light rail regulations would be applied to the tentative network, while Lloyd's Register was appointed to serve as the independent safety assessor. By mid-2012, construction activity was scheduled to begin during June 2013, while the light rail network's opening was planned to occur during August 2016.

On 8 May 2012, the Danish Parliament gave its approval for the construction of the Aarhus light rail line, which would be the first such modern line in Denmark, and granted the legal powers to proceed with the initiative. As a consequence, the Aarhus Letbane joint venture between the local municipality, the Ministry of Transport and the Midtjylland region was formally established to promote and further the project during August 2012. The construction of Phase 1 has been estimated to have cost DKK 2.4 billion ($408 million); financing was provided by the City of Aarhus (47.2 per cent), the Danish central government (47 per cent) and the Central Denmark Region (5.8 per cent). Additionally, the European Investment Bank provided DKK14.2 million to the initiative as part of the European Commission’s European Local Energy Assistance programme (ELENA).

The competitive tendering process for the network's construction was launched shortly after the formation of the joint venture. The contracts for the construction of Aarhus light rail line were awarded in three separate packages; these included a negotiated design-and-build contract that covered both the railway systems and rolling stock, valued at between €150 million and €180 million, along with a pair of lower value contracts to build the related civil works for the line. During July 2014, a German-Italian consortium, comprising Stadler Rail and Ansaldo STS, was awarded the contract for the construction and outfitting of Phase 1 of the Aarhus light rail. Stadler supplied the rolling stock for the line while Ansaldo STS provided the associated infrastructure, such as the tracks, signalling systems, control centre, and maintenance facility.

Phase 1
Phase 1 is a  double-track tramway running from Aarhus H station, via Skejby and Lisbjerg to Lystrup. The line forms a loop spanning across Aarhus' city centre, linking into the existing regional railways running to Odder in the south and Grenaa in the northeast; to facilitate such operations, the existing Odderbanen railway from Aarhus to Odder and Grenaabanen to Grenaa has been adapted to accommodate tram-train services. The two existing local lines have been electrified and adapted in other ways to Phase 1, but these alterations have not involved any change to their alignment. Furthermore, the heavy rail station at Aarhus, along with existing park and ride facilities near major stops along the route have been refurbished.

Various pieces of infrastructure and civil works were performed during the construction phase of the project. During October 2014, work commenced on the boring of a pair of tunnels to carry the tramway between Aarhus University and Aarhus University Hospital in Nørrebrogade. In the following year, both the Randers Way and Nørrebro Street had to be reduced in width in order to allocate space between the lanes for the installation of the new double-track line.

The opening of Phase 1 was originally scheduled to occur on 23 September 2017; however, the event was cancelled only a few hours before the event as a result of missing security clearances from the Danish government authority. Accordingly, the opening date was pushed back to the following month, before being further delayed thereafter. It was said that both the government and the city were inexperienced with tramway operation, since no tramways existed in Denmark 1972–2017, resulting in problems in interpreting the rules. Especially for the old lines, it was unclear whether they could be grandfathered or must obey rules for new lines.  On 20 December 2017, it was announced that approval for the new lines had finally been issued, allowing for services on the central tram section to commence during the following day. Traffic on Odderbanen and to Lisbjergskolen was delayed more and started on 25 August 2018. Traffic to Grenaa opened on 30 April 2019.

Future
Even prior to work commencing on Phase 1, several expansion plans had already been mooted. During January 2018, it was publicly stated that options for the construction of two new branches, from Lisbjerg to Hinnerup and from Aarhus to Brabrand, were in the detailed planning phase.

Rolling stock
Accordingly, contracts have been signed with Swiss rolling stock manufacturer Stadler for the delivery of two types of trams for the network:
 Stadler Tango: 12 vehicles, max speed , used between Grenaa and Aarhus H station
 Stadler Variobahn: 14 vehicles, max speed , used between Odder and Lystrup

Stations

Passenger numbers
In 2022, Aarhus Letbane had 5,475,521 passengers, 14% more than in 2019. On average, Aarhus Letbane transports 17.000 passengers daily, of which 81% travel on weekdays.

In February of 2023, the local Århus Stiftstidende newspaper released the official passenger numbers for all stations on Aarhus Letbane, except Trustrup. These numbers are the daily average of passengers boarding at each respective station on weekdays from the 15th of August 2022 to the 18th of December 2022. See below for each stations passenger numbers.

Central Tramway (L2 line : Aarhus H - Universitetshospitalet - Lisbjergskolen/Lystrup)

 Aarhus H: 4409
 Dokk1: 983
 Skolebakken: 1079
 Nørreport: 1055
 Universitetsparken: 405
 Aarhus Universitet (Ringgaden): 1075
 Stjernepladsen: 627
 Stockholmsgade: 451
 Vandtårnet (Ringvejen): 631
 Nehrus Allé: 442
 Olof Palmes Allé: 608
 Universitetshospitalet: 1233
 Gl. Skejby (Agro Food Park): 96
 Humlehuse: 41
 Klokhøjen: 71
 Lisbjerg Bygade: 136
 Lisbjergskolen: 106
 Lisbjerg-Terp: 30
 Nye: 43
 Lystrup: 915

Odder line (L2 line : Aarhus H - Odder)

 Aarhus H: 4409
 Kongsvang: 81
 Viby J: 678
 Rosenhøj: 314
 Øllegårdsvej: 69
 Gunnar Clausens Vej: 244
 Tranbjerg: 339
 Nørrevænget: 92
 Mølleparken: 79
 Mårslet: 413
 Vilhelmsborg: 13
 Beder: 144
 Malling: 207
 Assedrup: 15
 Rude Havvej: 80
 Odder: 404

Grenaa line (L1 line : Aarhus H - Torsøvej - Grenaa)

 Aarhus H: 4409
 Dokk1: 983
 Skolebakken: 1079
 Østbanetorvet: 274
 Risskov Strandpark: 118
 Vestre Strandallé: 231
 Torsøvej: 337
 Lystrup: 915
 Hovmarken: 64
 Hjortshøj: 319
 Skødstrup: 295
 Løgten: 167
 Hornslet: 386
 Mørke: 140
 Thorsager: 67
 Ryomgård: 334
 Kolind: 148
 Trustrup: No data published
 Hessel: 39
 Grenaa: 479

See also
 Odense Letbane

References

External links

Aarhus Letbane

Infrastructure in Aarhus
Tram transport in Denmark
Rail transport in Aarhus
2017 in rail transport
750 V DC railway electrification